The 1981 All-Big Eight Conference football team consists of American football players chosen by various organizations for All-Big Eight Conference teams for the 1981 NCAA Division I-A football season.  The selectors for the 1981 season included the Associated Press (AP).

Offensive selections

Quarterbacks
 Turner Gill, Nebraska (AP)

Running backs
 Mike Rozier, Nebraska (AP)
 Stanley Wilson, Oklahoma (AP)
 Dwayne Crutchfield, Iowa State (AP)

Tight ends
 Jamie Williams, Nebraska (AP)

Wide receivers
 Wayne Capers, Kansas (AP)

Centers
 Dave Rimington, Nebraska (AP)

Offensive guards
 Terry Crouch, Oklahoma (AP)
 Don Key, Oklahoma (AP)

Offensive tackles
 Lyndle Byford, Oklahoma (AP)
 Dan Hurley, Nebraska (AP)

Defensive selections

Defensive ends
 Reggie Singletary, Kansas State (AP)
 Jimmy Williams, Nebraska (AP)

Defensive tackles
 Jeff Gaylord, Missouri (AP)
 Rick Bryan, Oklahoma (AP)

Nose guards
 Gary Lewis, Oklahoma State (AP)

Linebackers
 Ricky Young, Oklahoma State (AP)
 Kyle McNorton, Kansas (AP)

Defensive backs
 Kevin Potter, Missouri (AP)
 Pete DiClementi, Oklahoma State  (AP)
 Joe Brown, Iowa State (AP)
 Joe Kreici, Nebraska (AP)

Special teams

Place-kicker
 Ron Verrilli, Missouri (AP)

Punter
 Bucky Scribner, Kansas (AP)

Key

AP = Associated Press

See also
 1981 College Football All-America Team

References

All-Big Seven Conference football team
All-Big Eight Conference football teams